The Delaware Handicap is an American Thoroughbred horse race run annually in mid July at Delaware Park Racetrack in  Wilmington, Delaware. The Grade 2 race is open to fillies and mares, age three and up, willing to race one and one-quarter miles on the dirt.

The race was inaugurated as the New Castle Handicap as part of the racing schedule with the 1937 opening of Delaware Park Racetrack. In 1953, the  new $100,000 purse offered by the New Castle Handicap made it the richest race in the world for fillies and mares. In 1955 it was renamed the Delaware Handicap.

The race was held at Saratoga from 1982 until 1985.

In 2017, champion filly Songbird won as the shortest-priced favorite in the race's history at 1-9 odds.

In 1939, Shangay Lily won the race as a seven year old, and is the oldest winner of the race.

Records
Speed record: 
 1:59.80 – Coup de Fusil (1987) (event and track record for  miles)

Most wins by a horse 
 2 Endine (1958,1959)
 2 Obeah (1969,1970)
 2 Blessing Angelica (1971,1972)
 2 Susan's Girl (1973,1975)
 2 Nastique (1988,1989)
 2 Royal Delta (2012,2013)
2 Elate (2018,2019)

Most wins by an owner:
 4 – Christiana Stable (1958, 1959, 1969, 1970)

Most wins by a jockey:
 4 – Ángel Cordero Jr. (1968, 1974, 1981, 1987)

Most wins by a trainer:
 4 – Henry S. Clark (1958, 1959, 1969, 1970)
 4 – Todd A. Pletcher (2001, 2006, 2007, 2010)
 4 – William I. Mott (2012, 2013, 2018, 2019)

Winners

References

External links
History of the Delaware Handicap
New Castle served as Delaware Handicap's predecessor
Ten Things You Should Know About the Delaware Handicap at Hello Race Fans

Grade 2 stakes races in the United States
Graded stakes races in the United States
Middle distance horse races for fillies and mares
Horse races in Delaware
Recurring sporting events established in 1937
Delaware Park Racetrack
1937 establishments in Delaware